Kimberly is a census-designated place (CDP) in Fayette County, West Virginia, United States. It is located along Armstrong Creek shortly before it enters the Kanawha River. As of the 2010 census, its population was 287.  It is in zip code 25118.

References

Census-designated places in Fayette County, West Virginia
Census-designated places in West Virginia